Formigine is a town and comune in the province of Modena, Emilia-Romagna, Italy. As of 2007, Formigine had an estimated population of 31,643.

History
Formigine originates from the foundation of its castle in 1201 by the Comune of Modena, as a defence against Reggio Emilia, during a war started over the control of the waters to convey to the many canals departing from the river Secchia. In 1395 Niccolò III d'Este gave it in fiefdom to Marco Pio, lord of Carpi.

Main sights
Medieval castle (thirteenth century) in the Town centre.
Villa Gandini, in the 'Park of the Resistance' Via San Antonio (now housing the public library)
Hermit Enrico's house (now museum)
San Bartolomeo Church in the Town centre opposite the Castle.

People
Andrea da Formigine (circa 1485 - 1559), Italian architect of the Renaissance period, active mainly in Bologna.
Cristian Zaccardo, World Cup-winning footballer
Riccardo Riccò, cyclist

Twin towns – sister cities

Formigine is twinned with:
 Kilkenny, Ireland
 Saumur, France

Sources

Cities and towns in Emilia-Romagna